Glenboro Airport  is located  southwest of Glenboro, Manitoba, Canada.

References

Registered aerodromes in Manitoba